Martti Talja (born 29 July 1951 in Lahti, Finland) is a Finnish politician, representing the Centre Party in the Parliament of Finland since 2015. He was elected to the Parliament from the Tavastia constituency in the 2015 elections with 3,941 votes.

References

External links
 Home page of Martti Talja

1951 births
Living people
People from Lahti
Centre Party (Finland) politicians
Members of the Parliament of Finland (2015–19)